Acolmiztli may refer to:
Acolnahuacatl (deity), an Aztec god also known as Acolmiztli
Nezahualcoyotl, a ruler of Texcoco with the second name Acolmiztli
Acolmiztli (Coatl Ichan), a ruler of Coatl Ichan